Cypress Branch is a  long 1st order tributary to St. Jones River in Kent County, Delaware.

Course
Cypress Branch rises at Whispering Pines in Kent County, Delaware on the Tidbury Creek divide.  Cypress Branch then flows northeasterly to meet the St. Jones River about 1 mile south of Dover, Delaware.

Watershed
Newell Branch drains  of area, receives about 44.8 in/year of precipitation, has a topographic wetness index of 604.28 and is about 1.2% forested.

See also
List of Delaware rivers

Maps

References

Rivers of Delaware
Rivers of Kent County, Delaware
Tributaries of Delaware Bay